Boswell High School is a public secondary school in Fort Worth, Texas, United States. It is part of the Eagle Mountain-Saginaw Independent School District, and serves students in grades nine through twelve.

Fine Arts
Boswell High School has the following fine arts programs:
 Art
 Band
 Choir
 Photography
 Theater

Athletics
Boswell High School has the following athletic programs; they also have athletic trainers: 
 Baseball
 Basketball
 Bowling
 Cross country
 Football
 Golf
 Gymnastics
 Powerlifting
 Soccer
 Softball
 Swimming
 Tennis
 Track
 Volleyball
 Wrestling

Notable alumni
 Brad Hawpe - Former MLB first baseman
 Angela Stanford - LPGA golfer 
 Kirk Watson - State Senator and former Austin mayor

References

External links
 

Eagle Mountain-Saginaw Independent School District high schools
Public high schools in Fort Worth, Texas